The Infanticide Act is the name of two 20th-century acts in English law that started treating the killing of an infant child by its mother during the early months of life as a lesser crime than murder.

England and Wales

The Infanticide Act 1922 effectively abolished the death penalty for a woman who deliberately killed her newborn child, while the balance of her mind was disturbed as a result of giving birth, by providing a partial defence to murder. The sentence that applies (as in other partial defences to murder) is the same as that for manslaughter. This act was repealed by section 2(3) of the Infanticide Act 1938.

The Infanticide Act 1938 extended this defence to cases where "at the time of the act or omission the balance of her mind was disturbed by reason of her not having fully recovered from the effect of giving birth to the child or by reason of the effect of lactation consequent upon the birth of the child."

Before the partial murder defence of diminished responsibility became part of English law in the Homicide Act 1957, this provided other than referral for possible insanity, the main means of lenient sentencing for a mother found guilty of deliberate killing of her infant than the mandatory life sentence or death sentence applying to murder.

In the 21st century it has become common for a severely post-natally depressed mother who kills her infant child not to receive a prison sentence, except in exceptional circumstances. Where a less extreme or no condition is suffered by the mother then causing or allowing a child (under 15) to die (under the Domestic Violence, Crime and Victims Act 2004, s.5) carries as of 2019 an effective sentence recommendation, unless the seven influential steps of sentencing determine otherwise, of 1–14 years' custody. Offender's responsibility substantially reduced by mental disorder or learning disability or lack of maturity will mean the lowest of three culpabilities applies, "Lesser culpability", and in that instance the starting point is taken as two years' custody setting a possible range of 1 to 4 years' custody.

In a report the terms of which were agreed on 1 November 2006, the Law Commission recognised the difficulties facing the court when a defendant is in denial and unwilling to submit to psychiatric examination, as she perceives the purpose of such examination as an attempt to prove her guilt. In such cases, the mother is unlikely to have any other defence and is therefore more likely to be convicted of murder or causing a child to die.

Northern Ireland
The Infanticide Act (Northern Ireland) 1939 makes similar arrangements for Northern Ireland.

Canada
The English Infanticide Acts also formed the basis for similar legislation in Canadian criminal law, which was enacted via an amendment to the Criminal Code in 1948. It is still in the Criminal Code and has not been updated since its enactment in 1948. It is an indictable offence, and carries a penalty of imprisonment not exceeding five years.

See also
List of short titles

References

Infanticide
English criminal law
Acts of the Parliament of the United Kingdom concerning England and Wales
United Kingdom Acts of Parliament 1922
United Kingdom Acts of Parliament 1938
Childhood in the United Kingdom
Childhood in England